Tyrilla Gouldson (born 1984) is a Sierra Leonean model and beauty pageant titleholder who was crowned as the winner of the 2008 edition of the Miss Sierra Leone pageant.

Early life and education
Born in Freetown, Sierra Leone, into a  Creole family, Gouldson attended St. Joseph's Convent School and is an alumna of the Institute of Public Administration and Management, University of Sierra Leone.She has a diploma in Local Government Administration and a certificate in Accounting.

Pageantry

Miss Sierra Leone 2008
Whilst representing Western Area Urban District, Gouldson was crowned winner of the 2008 edition of Miss Sierra Leone that was held on 20 June at the Family Kingdom Entertainment Complex in Freetown. This result qualified her to represent her country at the Miss World 2008 pageant held on 13 December at the Sandton Convention Centre in Johannesburg, South Africa.

Miss World 2008
She represented Sierra Leone at the Miss World 2008 pageant but failed to place.

External links
Tyrilla Gouldson on Miss Sierra Leone 2008
 Miss World Official Profile

References

Sierra Leone Creole people
People of Sierra Leone Creole descent
1984 births
Living people
Miss World 2008 delegates
Sierra Leonean beauty pageant winners
People from Freetown